Straw is a small village and townland in County Londonderry, Northern Ireland. In the 2001 Census it had a population of 57. It is situated within Mid-Ulster District approximately one mile south-west of Draperstown.

The local church is St. Columba's Catholic Church and the local school is St. Columba's Primary School.

See also
List of townlands in County Londonderry

References 

Villages in County Londonderry
Townlands of County Londonderry
Mid-Ulster District